Color key may refer to:
 Chroma key composition, a special effects technique layering images or video streams together
 Colorist work and the materials used, adding details to black-and-white line art
 Prepress proofing guides, used for fine-tuning items in printing presses